Greens Norton Pocket Park is a  Local Nature Reserve in Greens Norton in Northamptonshire. It is owned and managed by Green Norton Parish Council.

This former brick pit has a pond, wetland, grassland and woods. There are picnic tables and benches. Fauna include barn owls, grass snakes, great crested newts and green woodpeckers.

There is access by a bridleway from Bengal Lane and a footpath from Bury Hill.

References

Local Nature Reserves in Northamptonshire